Octavia is a 1982 American film directed by David Beaird and starring Susan Curtis.

Plot
A young blind woman is neglected by her overbearing father, who blames her for her mother's death. One day an escaped criminal breaks into her father's home and turns the sheltered blind woman's world upside down.

References

External links

1982 films
1982 drama films
Films directed by David Beaird
1980s English-language films
American drama films
1980s American films